Nicholas J. "Nat" Hickey (born Nicola Zarnecich; January 30, 1902 – September 16, 1979) was a Croatian-American professional basketball coach/player and baseball player. He turned to coaching basketball after his retirement from playing full-time in 1942 but occasionally activated himself as a player for the teams he was coaching. In 1948, at the age of 45, Hickey played two games with the Providence Steamrollers of the Basketball Association of America (BAA) while serving as the team's head coach, making him the oldest player in NBA history.

Early life
Hickey was born Nicola Zarnecich on the Croatian island of Korčula (then Kingdom of Dalmatia, Austro-Hungary). He attended Hoboken High School in Hoboken, New Jersey.

Basketball
As a 5'11" guard/forward, Hickey played from the 1920s through 1940s with multiple early professional teams, including the Hoboken St. Joseph's, Eddie Holly's Majors, New York Crescents, Cleveland Rosenblums, the Chicago Bruins, Boston Trojans, Original Celtics of the American Basketball League and the Pittsburgh Raiders, Indianapolis Kautskys, and Tri-Cities Blackhawks of the National Basketball League.

In the second year after the formation of the Basketball Association of America (the forerunner to the NBA), Hickey served 29 games as head coach of the Providence Steamrollers during the 1947–48 season. Hickey's team posted a 4–25 record during his tenure. He activated himself as a player on January 27, 1948, three days before his 46th birthday, and appeared in two games. He attempted six field goals – making none – and committed five personal fouls. He scored two points off of foul shots. All of the shots occurred in his debut game as a player against the St. Louis Bombers. While he also played a day later against the New York Knickerbockers, he did not record anything in that game. As a result of these games, Hickey still holds the record for the oldest player in NBA history at 45 years and 363 days.

Hickey became the coach of the Johnstown Clippers of the All-American Basketball League during the 1950–51 season. On January 11, 1951, Hickey was driving the team back to Johnstown, Pennsylvania, after a game in Wheeling, West Virginia, when he lost control of his car on the Lincoln Highway and crashed. Clippers player George Karmarkovich, a 24-year-old who was considered the team's biggest star, was ejected from the car and killed. The Clippers were disbanded the following day and Hickey did not return to coaching. Hickey was found to not be responsible for Karmarkovich's death.

Baseball
Aside from basketball, Hickey enjoyed a lengthy career in baseball, playing 15 minor league seasons and managing two.
Hickey managed and played several seasons of minor league baseball as an outfielder.  Notably, he was baseball Hall of Famer Stan Musial's first minor league manager with the Williamson Colts in 1938.

Hickey was inducted into the Cambria County Sports Hall of Fame in 1965 for his basketball and baseball achievements.

Personal life
Hickey was a cousin of parachute jumper Nick Piantanida.

Hickey died on September 16, 1979, in Johnstown, Pennsylvania.

BAA career statistics

Regular season

See also
 List of oldest and youngest National Basketball Association players
 List of National Basketball Association player-coaches

References

External links
 Minor league baseball statistics
 

1902 births
1979 deaths
Allentown Brooks players
American men's basketball coaches
American men's basketball players
American people of Croatian descent
Basketball players from New Jersey
Chicago Bruins players
Cleveland Rosenblums players
Croatian men's basketball players
Dayton Ducks players
Decatur Commodores players
Fitchburg (minor league baseball) players
Forwards (basketball)
Guards (basketball)
Hoboken High School alumni
Indianapolis Kautskys coaches
Indianapolis Kautskys players
Johnstown Johnnies players
Minor league baseball managers
National Basketball Association players from Croatia
Original Celtics players
People from Korčula
Pittsburgh Raiders players
Player-coaches
Providence Steamrollers coaches
Providence Steamrollers players
Reading Brooks players
Scranton Miners players
Sportspeople from Hoboken, New Jersey
Tri-Cities Blackhawks players
Waynesboro Villagers players
Williamson Colts players
Williamsport Grays players
Worcester Boosters players
Austro-Hungarian emigrants to the United States